Lucky 7 was a pirate television station, believed to be one of the first ever to operate in the United States, that aired for three nights in the spring of 1978 in Syracuse, New York.

Operation
Lucky 7 (operated by the "Renegade Broadcasting Company") aired for a total of 25 hours during the evenings of April 14–16, 1978 (Friday, Saturday and Sunday) on VHF channel 7, an otherwise-unoccupied frequency in the Syracuse area.

Programs aired by Lucky 7 included episodes of such TV series as Star Trek and The Twilight Zone, as well as several films unavailable on broadcast television at the time. These included films such as Rocky (1976) and One Flew Over the Cuckoo's Nest (1975), plus pornographic fare such as Deep Throat and Behind the Green Door (both 1972).

According to reports by the Associated Press and The New York Times, a man with a gas mask and a noose around his neck was seen onscreen occasionally, editorializing and claiming that half the TVs in the Syracuse area were able to see the broadcasts. Station identification featured a pair of dice rolled to seven, backed by female singers (reportedly from Syracuse University's (SU) Crouse Music School). Lucky 7 made national news, with the real Syracuse TV stations featuring bits of the pirate broadcasts on their own news shows.

Aftermath
As of 2023, the identity of the pirates remains unknown. At the time of broadcast, a Federal Communications Commission engineer theorized that the broadcasters tapped into Home Box Office and other networks to acquire programming, and that the transmissions probably originated from the SU area because Lucky 7 came in strongest near the campus. Subsequent speculation is that Lucky 7 was the brainchild of SU communications students (allegedly from the Newhouse School of Communications) with the assistance of nearby SUNY Morrisville College journalism program students, who used equipment normally available for closed circuit broadcasts on Channel 7 on the University's cable system, and transmitted the over-air signal using a standard VHF reception antenna.

References

Defunct television stations in the United States
Pirate television stations
Television channels and stations established in 1978
1978 establishments in New York (state)
Television channels and stations disestablished in 1978
1978 disestablishments in New York (state)
Television stations in Syracuse, New York
Defunct mass media in New York (state)